The 1961 New South Wales Road Racing Championship was a motor race staged at the Mount Panorama Circuit near Bathurst in New South Wales, Australia on 1 October 1961. The race was contested over 13 laps at a total distance of approximately 50 miles.

The race was won by Noel Hall driving a Cooper T51 Climax.

Results

References

New South Wales Road Racing Championship
Motorsport in Bathurst, New South Wales